The Crouch Valley line (sometimes referred to as the Southminster branch line) is a branch line off the Shenfield–Southend line in Essex, in the east of England.

The line is part of the Network Rail Strategic Route 7, SRS 07.05, and is classified as a London and South East commuter line. The stations and passenger services on the line are currently operated by Greater Anglia.

History

It was electrified at 25 kV AC overhead in 1986.

The number of trains on the Crouch Valley line is restricted to two trains per hour (one in each direction) at weekends and two every 40 minutes on weekdays,  with some additional services during peak times.

Nuclear freight

A nuclear flask handling facility operated to the south of Southminster station from 1962 during the operation and decommissioning of Bradwell nuclear power station, this facility was last used on 31 August 2006. Waste and fuel rods were transported to Sellafield. The timetable in the 1990s allowed for this traffic by the absence of a down and up passenger train on the branch late on Wednesday mornings.

Infrastructure

Only Wickford and  have platforms long enough to accommodate 12-coach trains, while each of the other stations on the line can accommodate eight coaches, though services on the line are typically only formed of four carriages due to the short terminus platform at Wickford being able to accommodate one four-car train.

As of late 2022, Wickford station building has been demolished for rebuilding.

Stations 

Services 
Trains are by Class 720 units, all services are currently operated by Greater Anglia. 
There are limited ticket facilities along the route so a conductor  is often provided on the train to assist passengers.

References

External links
The Crouch Valley Line today
The History of the Crouch Valley Line

Rail transport in Essex
Railway lines in the East of England
EA 1060
Railway lines opened in 1889
Standard gauge railways in England